S. palustris  may refer to:
 Sorex palustris, a species of semi-aquatic shrew found in North America
 Sphaenorhynchus palustris, a frog species endemic to Brazil
 Stachys palustris, the marsh woundwort, an edible perennial grassland herb species
 Stagnicola palustris, a species of air-breathing freshwater snail, an aquatic pulmonate gastropod mollusk in the family Lymnaeidae, the pond snails
 Sylvilagus palustris, the marsh rabbit, a mammal species found in marshes and swamps of coastal regions of the Eastern and Southern United States

See also
 Palustris (disambiguation)